ABM Abdullah (born 1954) is a Bangladeshi physician, academic and the personal physician of Prime Minister Sheikh Hasina. He was a professor in the Department of Internal Medicine and dean of the Faculty of Medicine at Bangabandhu Sheikh Mujib Medical University. He was awarded the Ekushey Padak in 2016 by the Government of Bangladesh.

Books

References

Living people
Bangladeshi physicians
Bangabandhu Sheikh Mujib Medical University alumni
Recipients of the Ekushey Padak
Honorary Fellows of Bangla Academy
1954 births